Emjay Anthony Salazar (born June 1, 2003) is an American teen actor and model. His major films include It's Complicated,  Chef, Krampus, Replicas, and Bad Moms.

Biography 
Emjay Anthony Salazar was born on June 1, 2003, in Clearwater Beach, Florida, to parents Michael and Trisha Salazar. He has an older sister named Sage. He modeled as a young child and made his acting debut in a Werther's candy commercial at the age of four. When he was 5, he and his family relocated to California.

In 2009 Emjay made his film debut in It's Complicated starring Meryl Streep and Alec Baldwin. He returned to his school studies for a year and a half and then resumed auditioning for commercials and television films. He portrayed Hector in The Divergent Series: Insurgent (2015).

His breakout role was in the 2014 film Chef, as Percy, the son of the protagonist, chef Carl Casper (Jon Favreau).

Filmography

References

External links
 
 
 

American male film actors
2003 births
Male actors from Florida
Living people
People from Clearwater, Florida
American male child actors
21st-century American male actors
Actors from Pinellas County, Florida